Vinec is a small settlement in the Municipality of Rogaška Slatina in eastern Slovenia, very close to the border with Croatia. The wider area around Rogaška Slatina is part of the traditional region of Styria. It is now included in the Savinja Statistical Region.

References

External links
Vinec on Geopedia

Populated places in the Municipality of Rogaška Slatina